Two ships of the Royal Navy have borne the name HMS Sea Nymph:

  was an 8-gun cutter in service in 1782.
  was an S-class submarine launched in 1942 and scrapped in 1948.

Royal Navy ship names